The 1914 Purdue Boilermakers football team was an American football team that represented Purdue University during the 1914 college football season. In their second season under head coach Andy Smith, the Boilermakers compiled a 5–2 record, finished in a tie for fifth place in the Western Conference with a 2–2 record against conference opponents, and outscored their opponents by a total of 157 to 73. Herbert S. O'Brien was the team captain.

Schedule

References

Purdue
Purdue Boilermakers football seasons
Purdue Boilermakers football